Calostemma is a small genus of herbaceous, perennial and bulbous plants in the Amaryllis family (Amaryllidaceae, subfamily Amaryllidoideae), commonly known as Wilcannia Lily. It consists of three species endemic to Australia, where they are distributed in arid regions with summer precipitation.

Description
Members of Calostemma often flowers in a leafless state, the narrow, shining-green, strap-like leaves usually preceding flowering and reaching a length of 25–30 cm. Flower colour is a purplish red or yellow with a tube sometimes paler and the anthers yellow.

Species 
The list of Calostemma   species, with their complete scientific name and authority, is given below.

Calostemma abdicatum P.J.Lang, distributed in South Australia. 
Calostemma luteum Sims, from Center Queensland to South Australia. 
Calostemma purpureum R.Br., South Central and South Eastern Australia.

Uses
Due to their large and showy flowers, members of this genus are used as ornamental plants.

References

Bibliography
Cooper, H.M. 1971. Notes and observations on Calostemma purpureum. S. Austral. Nat. 45(4): 112–114. 
Clark, T., Parsons, R.F. 1994. Ecology of Calostemma and Crinum (Amaryllidaceae) in the River Murray area, south-eastern Australia. Proc. Roy. Soc. Victoria 106: 129–145.

External links
Flowers of Calostemma lutea
Flowers of Calostemma purpureum

Amaryllidaceae genera
Amaryllidoideae
Taxa named by Robert Brown (botanist, born 1773)